Sir Taraknath Palit (1831–1914) was an Indian lawyer from West Bengal and a philanthropist. He was associated with the Swadeshi Movement during the Partition of Bengal and was one of the key figures behind the establishment of Ballygunge Science College of the Calcutta University and Jadavpur University.

Early life
Taraknath was born in 1831 in Kolkata, the only son of millionaire, Kalisankar Palit. He was brought up in Amarpur in Hooghly district, West Bengal.

Education
Taraknath graduated from college at the Hindu School, Kolkata and then he studied law in England. During his stay in England, he came in contact with the first Assamese graduate and civilian Anundoram Borooah.

Career
In 1871, Taraknath returned to India and established a legal practice.

Philanthropy
Taraknath Palit was instrumental in the founding of the National Council of Education (NCE) of India, "a stout supporter of nationalism and national development and attempted to nationalize education." He was one of the main figures behind the foundation of Bengal Technical Institute at the height of Swadeshi Movement, along with Maharaja Manindra Chandra Nandy, Bhupendra Nath Bose, Nilratan Sircar and Rashbihari Ghosh. It was established on 25 July 1906 and was the direct predecessor of Jadavpur University.

In June and October 1912, he executed two trust deeds for Calcutta University, donating Rs 1.5 million. His donations helped fund the 27 March 1914 creation of the University College of Science and Technology.

He was knighted by the British Government on 1 January 1913.

Death
He died on 3 October 1914.

Notes

References

1831 births
1914 deaths
20th-century Indian educational theorists
Indian philanthropists
Indian Knights Bachelor
Hindu School, Kolkata alumni
19th-century Indian educational theorists
Scholars from West Bengal
Indian educators
Indian lawyers
Indian scholars
Indian social workers
20th-century Indian lawyers
20th-century Indian educators
19th-century Indian educators
19th-century Indian scholars
20th-century Indian scholars
Social workers from West Bengal
Educators from West Bengal
Founders of Indian schools and colleges